Borneo Fashion Week (BFW) is a fashion event in Borneo which is held annually. BFW is founded by Stephanie Alcantara.

BFW is organised by Borneo Ads Management. The last edition of BFW was held for the first time in Kota Kinabalu, Sabah between 4 and 6 October 2019.

Locations

List of winners
BFW also incorporates award ceremony to acknowledge outstanding designers and models. The list of winners for previous editions are as following:

2017

2018

2019

References

Fashion events in Malaysia
Fashion weeks